Wael Shueb (born 31 October 1987 in Syria) is a Syrian karateka. He lives in Germany where he arrived as a refugee after leaving war-torn Syria in 2015.

He is one of two male karatekas to be included in the International Olympic Committee (IOC)'s Refugee Olympic Team (EOR) for the 2020 Olympic Games at Tokyo, where he competed in the men's kata competition. He finished in 6th place in his pool in the elimination round of the men's kata event and he did not advance to the next round.

References 

1987 births
Living people
Place of birth missing (living people)
Refugees of the Syrian civil war
Refugee Olympic Team at the 2020 Summer Olympics
Syrian expatriates in Germany
Syrian male karateka
German male karateka
Karateka at the 2020 Summer Olympics